Ituzaingó is a city in Corrientes Province, Argentina.

The Yacyretá Dam is nearby.

Climate

References

External links

 Municipal website

Populated places in Corrientes Province
Cities in Argentina
Argentina
Corrientes Province